is a Japanese Roman Catholic prelate and professed member from the Divine Word Missionaries who has been serving as Archbishop of Tokyo since his appointment in 2017. He was a former worker in the missions of Ghana in Western Africa. Prior to his installation as Archbishop of Tokyo, he had served as the Bishop of Niigata since 2004 when he was first named as a bishop.

Kikuchi serves as the current President of Caritas Japan as well as for Caritas Asia. He also serves as a member of the Representative Council of Caritas Internationalis.

Life
Tarcisio Isao Kikuchi was born in Iwate on 1 November 1958.

Kikuchi was professed into the Divine Word Missionaries in March 1985 prior to his ordination to the priesthood on 15 March 1986. In 1986 after his ordination he was sent to West Africa where he served in the missions in Ghana. He served in Koforidua as a pastor before being elected as the provincial for his order in 1999 back in Japan. Pope John Paul II appointed him as the Bishop of Niigata on 29 April 2004 and he received his episcopal consecration as a bishop on the following 20 September at the Salle de Seishin Girls' High School in Niigata from Peter Takeo Okada. Rafael Masahiro Umemura and Marcellino Taiji Tani served as the co-consecrators.

Kikuchi attended two "ad limina" visits: one was made to Pope Benedict XVI on 14 December 2007 and the other was made to Pope Francis on 20 March 2015. He attended the beatification for Takayama Ukon in Osaka in 2017 and proposed the late samurai as "a model for all" since he had "renounced privileges and wealth for the faith". Pope Francis appointed Kikuchi as the new Archbishop of Tokyo on 25 October 2017; Kikuchi was installed in his new episcopal see on 16 December 2017.

He serves as a current member on the Representative Council of Caritas Internationalis and also serves as the current President for both Caritas Japan and Caritas Asia. Kikuchi has also been a member of the Congregation for the Evangelization of Peoples since 2014.

Positions

North Korea
Kikuchi has been a staunch advocate for dialogue in relation to North Korea's nuclear program and their diplomatic crisis with the United States of America. In August 2017 he expressed his hope that the Japanese government would undertake "an initiative of dialogue that involves all the sides concerned in this crisis to find a diplomatic solution".

He also asserted that dialogue remains "the only solution to peaceful coexistence in this part of Asia". He also accused "new political leaders" of exploiting the confrontation for their own political purposes and called for renewed negotiations.

Evangelization
Kikuchi supports missionary and evangelization efforts. He affirms that it is vital to "sow and witness the Gospel in our society today" though ponders on "where and how to evangelize" in the community. Kikuchi continues that "it is up to us to proclaim and witness the joy of the Gospel to mankind today. The grace of Christ sustains us and guides us in this journey" to bring His message to others.

Kikuchi spoke on evangelization during the visit of Cardinal Fernando Filoni to Japan in September 2017 and expressed his hope that evangelization efforts on the part of the faithful would be "humble" but bold and direct.

The environment
Kikuchi is a strong advocate of environmental protection and wrote a piece for Asia News in support of the pope's encyclical Laudato si'. The bishop said that in the piece that it was the role of all Christians in the protection and development of the environment with the proper allocation of resources on an equal level. He further asserted that "we must act to protect the lives of future generations" if "environmental degradation" went unchecked and too far. He further elaborated that the encyclical provided a "solid foundation" to be built upon for committing oneself to environmental protection and activism.

LGBT issue
Kikuchi is said to be against same-sex marriage, while the HIV/AIDS Desk which he was in charge of had a gay pastor and joined LGBT-friendly events.

2020 Summer Olympics
Asa a prevention of COVID-19 infection, Kikuchi asked Olympic athletes and other visitors to avoid visiting churches in the Archdiocese of Tokyo.

References

External links

 Catholic Hierarchy

1958 births
21st-century Roman Catholic archbishops in Japan
Bishops appointed by Pope John Paul II
Divine Word Missionaries Order
Japanese Roman Catholic missionaries
Living people
People from Iwate Prefecture
Roman Catholic missionaries in Ghana
Japanese Roman Catholic archbishops